Toasternets were an early-1990s instantiation of the decentralized Internet, featuring open-standards-based federated services, radical decentralization, ad-hoc routing and consisting of many small individual and collective networks rather than a cartel of large commercial Internet Service Provider networks. Today's "community networks" and decentralized social networks are the closest modern inheritors of the ethos of the 1991-1994 era Toasternets.

History
The first known use of the word was by Robert Ullmann, then active in the Internet Engineering Task Force developing next-generation Internet addressing and routing protocols. He circulated two documents, entitled Toasternet Part I (December 1989) and Toasternet Part II (March 1992) on the IETF mailing list, and then published RFCs 1475 and 1476 and the "CATNIP" Internet-Draft in June 1993.

Early toasternet proponent Tim Pozar described them thus:

Pozar, and other early toasternet builders Bill Woodcock and John Gilmore were participants in the cooperative The Little Garden, the first Internet service provider based on the west coast of the United States. Founded and led by Tom Jennings, The Little Garden (named for the Vietnamese restaurant where its foundational meetings were held) was an Internet Service Provider network built between 1992 and 1996 in the toasternet ethos, and consisting of constituent toasternet members; some individual, and some collective. Many of the initial Little Garden members went on to become founding members of Packet Clearing House, the not-for-profit which now supports core Internet infrastructure globally, but still continues to promulgate the toasternet values of collaborative competition and "permissionless" new market entry.

Writing contemporaneously in Wired, Jonathan Steuer said,

Gareth Bronwyn, also writing in Wired in 1993, defined them much more haphazardly, saying that they used "Cheap Internet routers made with old PCs" and coining the umbrella term "grunge computing."

It is worthy of note that, prior to the 1992 privatization of the Internet via Al Gore's National Information Infrastructure plan, the operation of toasternets was not actually legal, since Internet connectivity was supplied to authorized parties (generally defense contractors and research universities) by, and at the expense of, the US Defense Department's Advanced Research Projects Agency, and toasternets extended access to the network beyond the parties authorized to use it.

Many people also linked the name with a much more literal demonstration of SNMP-enabled toasters which had been connected to an Ethernet network by network management software vendor Epilogue, which caught the public's fancy at the time, and received some press coverage.

References

External links 
 Slackware Toasternet information page
 Tim Pozar's Toasternet FAQ

History of computing
History of telecommunications
Internet culture
1990s in Internet culture
1991 in Internet culture
1992 in Internet culture
1993 in Internet culture
Internet activism
Internet-related activism
Internet in 1991
Internet in 1992
Internet in 1993